West 147th–149th Streets Historic District is a national historic district in Harlem, New York, New York.  It consists of 60 contributing buildings; 58 tenements, one school, and one stable built between 1894 and 1905.  With the exception of the stable, all of the buildings are five or six stories tall, all with brick facades.  Most have some form of terra cotta ornament and all have pressed metal cornices. The earlier buildings reflect the Romanesque Revival style, with ornamental inspiration drawn from Renaissance and French Beaux-Arts styles.

It was listed on the National Register of Historic Places in 2003.

References

Residential buildings on the National Register of Historic Places in Manhattan
Colonial Revival architecture in New York City
Harlem
Historic districts on the National Register of Historic Places in Manhattan
Historic districts in Manhattan
New York City Designated Landmarks in Manhattan
New York City designated historic districts